The Ambassador Extraordinary and Plenipotentiary of Ukraine to Poland is the ambassador of Ukraine to Poland. The current ambassador is Vasyl Zvarych. He was appointed to the position in February 2022.

The first Ukrainian ambassador to Poland assumed his post in 1992, the same year a Ukrainian embassy opened in Warsaw.

List of representatives

Ukrainian People's Republic
 1918–1918 Oleksandr Karpynsky (never assumed the office)
 1919–1920 Andriy Livytskyi

Ukrainian Soviet Socialist Republic
 1920–1920 Isai Khurgin
 1921–1921 Mieczysław Łoganowski
 1921–1922 Oleksandr Shumsky
 1922–1923 Hryhoriy Besyedovsky

Ukraine
 1991–1991 Teodoziy Starak (provisional)
 1991–1992 Anatoliy Shevchuk (government delegate)
 1992–1994 Hennadiy Udovenko
 1994–1998 Petro Sardachuk
 1999–2002 Dmytro Pavlychko
 2002–2003 Oleksandr Nykonenko
 2003–2005 Ihor Kharchenko
 2005–2010 Olexander Motsyk
 2010–2014 Markiyan Malsky
 2014–2022 Andrii Deshchytsia
 Since 2022Vasyl Zvarych

See also 
 Ukrainian Embassy, Warsaw
 Ambassador of Poland to Ukraine

References

External links 
  Embassy of Ukraine to Poland: Previous Ambassadors

 
Poland
Ukraine